Elena Garro (December 11, 1916 – August 22, 1998) was a Mexican screenwriter, journalist, dramaturg, short story writer, and novelist. She has been described as the initiator of the Magical Realism movement, though she rejected this affiliation. She is a recipient of the Sor Juana Inés de la Cruz Prize.

Biography
Elena Garro was born in Puebla, Mexico to a Spanish father and a Mexican mother, the third of five children. She spent her childhood in Mexico City but moved to Iguala, Guerrero, during the Cristero War. She studied literature, choreography and theater in the National Autonomous University of Mexico in Mexico City, where she was an active member of Julio Bracho's theatre group. She married Octavio Paz in 1937 and began a career in literature and theater. Garro's fiction explored  political and social causes related to life in Mexico. Her citizenship status and views on Indian rights aroused controversy in Mexico. According to her biographer, members of Garro's family sympathized with white-supremacy and this influenced her predilection of blond people as more beautiful. After her divorce from Paz in 1959, Garro spent time in seclusion between Mexico City, Madrid and Paris in Europe until moving back to Cuernavaca, Mexico in 1994. As a close ally of politician Carlos Madrazo she was also targeted in a campaign against political dissidents in 1968, and despite her anti-communist and right-wing views she became the object of an anti-communist smear campaign in the aftermath of the Tlatelolco Massacre.

Bibliography 
 Los recuerdos del porvenir, México, Joaquín Mortiz, 1963, translated as Recollections of Things to Come by Ruth L. C. Simms.  
 Andamos huyendo Lola, México, Joaquín Mortiz, 1980.
 Testimonios sobre Mariana, México, Grijalbo, 1981. 
 Reencuentro de personajes, México, Grijalbo, 1982, 
 La casa junto al río. México, Grijalbo, 1983, 
 Y Matarazo no llamó..., México, Grijalbo, 1991. 
 Inés. México, Grijalbo, 1995, 
 Tiempo destino y opresión en la obra de Elena Garro [Time, Destiny and Oppression in the Work of Elena Garro], by Rhina Toruño Haensly (under Rhina Toruño). An authoritative book on the work of Elena Garro, a leading twentieth-century Mexican author. New York, NY: Mellen University Press, 1996. ISBN 0-7734-4258-8.
 Busca mi esquela & Primer amor. 2. ed. Monterrey, Ediciones Castillo, 1998. (Colección Más allá; 14) , translated as First Love & Look for My Obituary: Two Novellas, and winner of the Sor Juana Inés de la Cruz Prize
 Un traje rojo para un duelo. Monterrey, Ediciones Castillo, 1996, 
 Un corazón en un bote de basura, México, Joaquín Mortiz, 1996, 
 Mi hermanita Magdalena, Monterrey, Ediciones Castillo, 1998. 
 Cita con la memoria. Elena Garro cuenta su vida a Rhina Toruño. Análisis de sus obras. [Encounter With Memory. Elena Garro Recounts her Story Life to Rhina Toruño], by Rhina Toruño Haensly (under Rhina Toruño). Buenos Aires, Argentina: Prueba de Galera, 2004. ISBN 987-20648-6-5.

References

1916 births
1998 deaths
Magic realism writers
Mexican people of Asturian descent
Mexican people of Spanish descent
Mexican women novelists
Mexican dramatists and playwrights
Mexican women short story writers
Mexican short story writers
Women dramatists and playwrights
20th-century Mexican women writers
People from Puebla (city)
20th-century Mexican novelists
20th-century Mexican dramatists and playwrights
20th-century short story writers
Mexican women screenwriters
20th-century Mexican screenwriters